Saint-Julien-Maumont (Limousin: Sent Julian Momon) is a commune in the Corrèze department in central France.

Population

Personalities
 Pierre Roger de Beaufort, Pope Gregory XI

See also
Communes of the Corrèze department

References

Communes of Corrèze